Vehicle registration plates of the Republic of Artsakh (also referred to as the Nagorno-Karabakh Republic) have black characters on a rectangular white background. Current plates are European standard 520 mm × 110 mm, and are composed of two numbers, two letters in the middle, and two or three other numbers. At the left side is located the international code "AM" with an oval car plaque and, sometimes, the national flag of Armenia.
Starting from 6 August 2014 a new design of license plates was implemented. The license plates have a flag of Armenia on the left side, a security hologram and a machinery readable Data Matrix Code. In 2014, the style and fonts were changed to FE-Schrift, and the letters and digits now have the same font size. In addition, a silver identifier band has been added on the right side of the flag and code.

Armenian registration plates with region codes 22 and 90 are used in Artsakh (for example, "(AM) 90 SO 123").

References

Artsakh
Republic of Artsakh
Republic of Artsakh-related lists